Line Jensen may refer to:

Line Jensen (triathlete) (born 1981), Danish triathlete
Line Sigvardsen Jensen (born 1991), Danish footballer